Darko Miladin (born 1 April 1979 in Dubrovnik, SR Croatia, Yugoslavia) is a Croatian retired football player.

International career
He made his debut for Croatia in a June 1999 Korea Cup match against the hosts, but it remained his sole international appearance.

References

External links
 

1979 births
Living people
Sportspeople from Dubrovnik
Association football defenders
Croatian footballers
Croatia international footballers
HNK Hajduk Split players
FC Schaffhausen players
Ergotelis F.C. players
HNK Rijeka players
Croatian Football League players
Swiss Super League players
Super League Greece players
Croatian expatriate footballers
Expatriate footballers in Switzerland
Croatian expatriate sportspeople in Switzerland
Expatriate footballers in Greece
Croatian expatriate sportspeople in Greece